The correlation between old age and driving has been a notable topic for many years . In 2018, there were over 45 million licensed drivers in the United States over the age of 65—a 60% increase from 2000. Driving is said to help older adults stay mobile and independent, but as their age increases the risk of potentially injuring themselves or others significantly increases as well. In 2019, drivers 65 years and older accounted for 8,760 motor vehicle traffic deaths, and 205,691 non-fatal accidents.  Due to their physical frailty, older drivers are more likely to be injured in an accident and more likely to die of that injury. When frailty is accounted for and older drivers are compared to younger persons driving the same amount the over-representation disappears. According to the Insurance Institute for Highway Safety, a senior citizen is more likely than a younger driver to be at fault in an accident in which they are involved. The most common violations include: failure to obey traffic signals, unsafe turns and passing, and failure to yield.

Physical strength, mental acuity, and motor function begin to deteriorate as a person ages, but the degree of decline varies from person to person. There is currently no age cutoff preventing an older adult from driving in the United States. Although, there are some voluntary measures a person can utilize to check their driving abilities. According to the Centres for Disease Control and Prevention, precautionary measures include driving in daylight and good weather, planning the route before departing and receiving an eye exam once a year. Despite these measures, often, family members of an elderly person are faced with the responsibility of trying to get them to give up driving. This can be challenging because few senior citizens are voluntarily willing to give up their own car keys.

Most state laws allow senior citizens to continue driving provided they meet the same requirements as younger adults. Some states require persons above a specified age to take certain tests when renewing their licenses, up to and including a road test, or to receive a physician's certificate stating they are medically fit to operate a motor vehicle. Some older adults may be permitted to drive, but with added limitations such as the amount of driving they can do, the hours in which they can drive, or the distance from home they can travel. These restrictions may be placed either by the law or their insurance provider which vary by state.

As the process of aging varies from one person to the next, the age at which an elderly person's ability to safely operate a motor vehicle declines varies between persons. This creates controversy in regulating driving in the elderly. Senior citizens are seen by some as among the safest drivers on the road, as they generally do not speed or take risks, and they are more likely to wear seatbelts. Others believe there should be increased testing to ensure older drivers are capable of safe driving.

The AARP staunchly opposes testing elderly drivers on the basis of age as age discrimination, and argued the decision to retire from driving should be left to the individual.

Senses, physical abilities, and cognition

There are a multitude of conditions that correlate with old age and have negative effects on senses, physical abilities, and driving capabilities.  

The following are two senses that are important for safe driving:

 Vision: With aging, the lens of the eye loses its transparency and becomes cloudy, a condition commonly known as cataracts. This increases the light scattering by the eye's optical system and is associated with causing disability glare and increased risk of being involved in a crash.  Other common age related vision conditions that can affect driving performance are glaucoma and macular degeneration. Glaucoma leads to peripheral vision loss and blindness in advanced disease. 
Hearing: Age-related hearing loss or presbycusis is a common condition in people over the age of 65. Studies have shown that elderly with hearing loss are more likely to be involved in crashes and commit traffic violations. Additionally, older drivers with hearing loss demonstrate worse driving performance in the presence of distractors than those with good hearing and restricted driving mobility.

Physical abilities such as motor skills are important for driving ability:

 Motor skills: Aging causes decreased physical abilities, such as gross and fine motor skills and reflexes, thereby rendering the driver physically unable to perform at a safe level. As age increases, there is a reduction in muscle mass and elasticity, bone mass, central and peripheral nerve fibers. These partly explain why an elderly motorist may drive more slowly.

Cognition is reduced with age and affects driving ability.
Cognition: Reduced cognition can occur due to mental conditions that are associated with old age including Parkinson's disease, Alzheimer's disease, and dementia. These conditions can impair one's ability to drive.

Signs of impairment
An aging person may have some issues admitting they are no longer fit to take the wheel. It may be difficult to talk with a loved one who has a driving impairment, but it is essential to communicate the importance of safety when operating a motor vehicle.

The following are considered signs that an elderly person's driving may be impaired:
 Confusion while driving somewhere
 Having two or more minor accidents in a short period of time
 Thinking the speed limit is too high
 Others not feeling comfortable riding in a vehicle with the driver

Aging individuals should be asked the following questions:
 When driving, do objects such as parked cars or pedestrians catch them by surprise?
 Do they have difficulty seeing other cars before the driver honks? Do they get honked by other drivers for reasons you don't understand?
 Do they have limited neck rotation?
 Are their reflexes slower and reaction time longer than they used to be?
 Do they ever feel momentarily confused, nervous, or uncomfortable while driving?
 Has a family member ever suggested that they should stop driving?
 Do you have a low-contrast sensitivity? For example, do they have trouble seeing a grey car at dusk, a black car at night, or a white car on a snowy roadway?
 Is your visual acuity on a 20/20 scale below the minimum level required by your state?

Growing concern
The number of older drivers on the road is growing and bound to increase at a more rapid rate, as more baby boomers become seniors. According to an AARP spokeswoman, by 2030 over 78 million boomers will be 65+, and research shows that men will outlive their driving abilities by six years and women by 10.

A 2003 Gallup showed that 89% of Americans were in favor increased testing requirements of individuals over the age of 65. However, support for a driving age restriction under 70 years old was met with less than 10% support among those surveyed, whereas 64% of respondents believed there should to be no age limits at all.

Approximately 9,000 senior aged drivers died from driving accidents in 2019, and more than 200,000 were treated in the emergency department for driving related injuries. Gallup reported that more Americans believed teenagers pose a greater driving risk than adults over the age of 75. Studies have shown that the highest driving accidents rates are among drivers aged less than 20 and those greater than 65. However, drivers above the age of 85 are 3 times more likely to be in a fatal crash compared to those aged less than 20, and 20 times more likely than drivers aged less than 60.

Becoming a Safer Driver 
There are some changes that older drivers can adopt to help some conditions that come with old aging.

 Physical therapy can help improve strength and flexibility to help elderly individuals who have trouble turning their heads while driving. 
 Eye doctors can prescribe glasses or contact lenses to help with vision related conditions.
 Older drivers should avoid driving at night if they have trouble seeing in the dark.

Driving rules for older drivers in the United States 
The 50 states differ in their laws governing drivers' licenses for older adults:

Effects of giving up driving
The operation of a private vehicle is essential to life in many places, especially to one's independence. After losing their ability to drive, an elderly person may be forced to make major lifestyle changes, often becoming unable to perform activities they once were able to. The following effects have been noted in former drivers.

Health Effects

 Reduced physical mobility and functioning due to decreased exercise and participation in outside activities.
 Increased risk of developing depression.
 Increased acceleration of cognitive decline.
 Increased mortality risk (4-6 times more likely to die as drivers).

Social Effects

 Increased risk of social isolation.
 Decreased social health (i.e. social engagement, social contacts/support, social satisfaction).
 Increased admittance to long-term care facilities.

The inability to drive results in increased dependence on caregivers for social and medical transportation. According to the National Aging and Disability Transportation Center, family caregivers spend approximately 5 hours a day arranging or providing transportation for senior family members.  This increased caregiver responsibility can conflict with work or other life demands, often resulting in an inability to help seniors.

Where available, some senior citizens may turn to public transportation or paratransit for medical appointments and personal needs. Though individuals can find alternative means of transportation, these alternatives may be more limiting than one's own car.

Senior-friendly transportation 
Because giving up driving is viewed by the elderly as a loss of their independence, many may be reluctant to seek out alternative forms of transportation when they are no longer able to drive. The best way for transit providers to meet the transportation needs of most older Americans is to meet the transportation needs of the general adult population. Their needs are similar to other age groups: shopping, getting to work, medical appointments, going to restaurants and visiting friends. Seniors are looking for travel services that provide control, autonomy, and choice. The National Center on Senior Transportation (NCST) states that 83% of older Americans agree that public transit provides easy access to the things that they need in everyday life.

Five A's of Senior-Friendly Transportation 
The Beverly Foundation developed these five aspects to greater encompass the necessary requirements to create a senior-friendly transportation alternative:
 Availability: This alone is not the solution to transportation challenges for older adults. Most public and community transportation systems require passengers to get to a transit stop or to the curb in order to use their services, and senior-friendly transportation must be different. The same limitations that make it difficult/impossible for seniors to drive also can make it difficult for them to get to the transit stop or the curb, or even to get on or off a vehicle without assistance.
 Acceptability: This suggests senior passenger criteria of comfort and convenience of service. Seniors may have higher standards for transportation because they are used to their personal vehicles. Senior-friendly transportation needs to recognize these standards to which it is being measured.
 Accessibility: Passengers must be able to access the service and the vehicle. The system must take services to the passengers, and offer them assistance and support prior to, during, and following their travel, coined as "door-to-door, door-through-door, and at-the-destination assistance."
 Adaptability: Calls for the service to meet the assistance needs of older adults. Multi-stop metro and bus rides are more difficult for elderly because they lack flexibility, which is essential for senior-friendly transportation. It needs to be able to accommodate the use of walkers and service animals, also.
 Affordability: Aims for transportation to be affordable to passengers and to the transportation services. Research shows it can cost between $5000 and $7500 a year to own and operate an automobile. However, when older adults can no longer drive, they rarely convert savings in automobile ownership into funds which they can use for another transportation option. Senior-friendly transportation systems have the job to educate the elderly about alternative options, and help them to understand that these costs are not an additional expense, but a substitute for the cost of a personal automobile.

See also
 Old man's car
 Santa Monica Farmers Market crash

External links
 Centers for Disease Control and Prevention, Older Adult Drivers Fact Sheet.
 Kanetix, Seniors & Driving Canadian Statistics.

References

Old age
Road safety